Sage Gabriel Carlos Atreyu Elsesser (born January 31, 1997), also known as Navy Blue, is an American regular-footed skateboarder, rapper, record producer, visual artist, and model.

Elsesser has been sponsored by several skater fashion brands including Converse and Supreme, as well as becoming a professional skater in 2014 through skater collective and clothing store Fucking Awesome. Aside from skating and music, he is also a model for various clothing brands and an artist, most notably handling the art direction for Earl Sweatshirt's album I Don't Like Shit, I Don't Go Outside in 2015.

In 2015, Elsesser began releasing several EPs under his Navy Blue stage name, in addition to rapping with and producing for the likes of Earl Sweatshirt, MIKE, Armand Hammer and Wiki, among many others. On February 4, 2020, he founded independent record label Freedom Sounds with the release of his debut studio album Àdá Irin. Elsesser has since followed-up with two studio albums; Song of Sage: Post Panic! (2020) and Navy's Reprise (2021).

Discography

Studio albums
 Àdá Irin (2020)
 Song of Sage: Post Panic! (2020)
 Navy's Reprise (2021)
 Gift of Gabriel: Rain’s Reign! (2022)
 Crypt of Carlos: Onward! (2022)
 Arc of Atreyu: Neverending! (2022)

Extended plays
 According to the Waterbearer (2015)
 Lately (2016)
 April Blue (2017)
 Soul Golden (2017) 
 Guilt & Sincerity (2017)
 Navy in Rage (2017)
 Yvan Wen (2018)
 Forest Green (2018)
 From the Heart... (2018)
 Gangway for Navy (2019)

Singles

As lead artist

As featured artist

Guest appearances

Production discography

2017
MIKE - 
 "Melvin"

Tha God Fahim - Dump Gawd
 04. "Samurai's Cup of Tea" 

Mach-Hommy - Dump Gawd: Hommy Edition
 02. "A Partridge & A Pear Tree" (featuring Tha God Fahim)
 08. "Mac Flurries" (featuring Heem Stogied)
 11. "Rorshach's" (featuring Tha God Fahim)

MIKE - May God Bless Your Hustle
 02. "Hunger" 
 03. "Armour"

Navy Blue - Navy in Rage
 01. "Temple//Tomb"
 02. "Angel-Eyes" (featuring Qeedar)
 03. "Sundown"
 04. "Life----Line"

Mach-Hommy - Fete Des Morts AKA Dia De Los Muertos
 03. "Embarrassment of Riches"

Cities Aviv -
 "If I Could Hold Your Soul Part II"

2018
Navy Blue - Yvan Wen
 01  "Head Full of Braids..."
 02. "No More..."
 03. "Detroit..." (featuring Nyku)
 04. "Give Em Hell..."

Navy Blue - Forest Green
 01. "Eastbound"
 02. "War(mth)"
 03. "All We Know!" (featuring Adé Hakim)

Navy Blue - From the Heart...
 01. "Machete"
 02. "Enchantment" (featuring MIKE)
 03. "Never Thought I'd Be One to Cry Like This"
 04. "Prayer (Me&You)"
 05. "Give Love a Try!"
 06. "Loveship (Empathy)"
 08. "Green & Brown"

Pink Siifu - Ensley
 11. "Stay Sane"

Earl Sweatshirt - Some Rap Songs
 08. "The Bends"
 10. "Azucar"

2019

Navy Blue - Gangway for Navy
 01. "Apprehension"
 02. "Deathmask..."
 03. "Can't Take Me"
 04. "Shine on Me!" (featuring MIKE)
 05. "I Love You!"
 06. "Slow Down"
 07. "Carlos" (featuring MIKE)
 08. "Separate Ways!"

MIKE - Tears of Joy
 20. "Stargazer Pt. 3"

2020

Camden Malik - Spaceship Symphonies
 04. "Give Me a Call" (featuring Shawn May as "juneayth.")

Armand Hammer - Shrines
 02. "Solarium"
 12. "Parables" (featuring Akai Solo)
 13. "Ramesses II" (featuring Earl Sweatshirt, Moor Mother and Fielded) 

Moor Mother & Billy Woods - Brass
 11. "Guinness"

2021

Wiki - Half God
 01. "Not Today (Intro)"
 02. "Roof"
 03. "Remarkably"
 04. "Can't Do This Alone" (featuring Navy Blue)
 05. "Never Fall Off"
 06. "Drug Supplier" (featuring Jesse James Solomon)
 07. "Wik tha God"
 08. "Ego Death"
 09. "The Business"
 10. "Home"
 11. "All I Need" (featuring Earl Sweatshirt)
 12. "Gas Face" (featuring Remy Banks)
 13. "The Promised" (featuring MIKE)
 14. "New Truths"
 15. "Still Here" (featuring Duendita)
 16. "Grape Soda"

2022

Earl Sweatshirt - Sick!
 03. "Sick!"

References

External links
 Earl Sweatshirt and Sage Elsesser reflect on two decades of friendship - i.D - 08.12.2022

1997 births
Living people
American skateboarders
African-American skateboarders
Male models from New York (state)
Rappers from Los Angeles
Record producers from Los Angeles
Artist skateboarders
21st-century African-American sportspeople